A bibliography of reference material associated with the James Bond films, novels and genre.

General reference books

Related biographies

Ian Fleming

James Bond

Albert R. Broccoli

Sean Connery

David Niven

George Lazenby

Roger Moore

Pierce Brosnan

Daniel Craig

Cast

Crew

See also
 Bibliography of film by genre
 The Poor Man's James Bond

References

External links
 JAMES BOND NON-FICTION BOOKS

James Bond
Bibliographies of film